Chengnan Subdistrict is a subdistrict of Samzhubzê District, Shigatse, in the Tibet Autonomous Region of China. , it has five residential communities under its administration.

References 

Township-level divisions of Tibet
Samzhubzê District
Subdistricts of the People's Republic of China